The gorgeous bushshrike (Telophorus viridis) is a species of bird in the family Malaconotidae. It is also known as the four-coloured bushshrike. Some use the name gorgeous bushshrike for the subspecies Telophorus viridis viridis only.

Taxonomy
Most authorities consider Telophorus viridis to comprise four subspecies: T. v. viridis, T. v. nigricauda, T. v. quartus and T. v. quadricolor.  Others split the taxon into two species: T. viridis and T. quadricolor.

Behavior
Gorgeous bush-shrikes are seldom seen despite being a commonly occurring species, as they mostly dwell in densely vegetated woodlands. They are primarily insectivorous, gleaning insects from the understory growth they inhabit.

Distribution
Found in Angola, Republic of the Congo, Democratic Republic of the Congo, Gabon, and Zambia (T. v. viridis), coastal Kenya and Tanzania (T. v. nigricauda), Malawi, Mozambique and Zimbabwe (T. v. quartus) and South Africa and Eswatini (T. v. quadricolor).

Gallery

References

External links
 Gorgeous/Four-coloured bushshrike - Species text in The Atlas of Southern African Birds.

Gorgeous bushshrike
Birds of Sub-Saharan Africa
gorgeous bushshrike
Taxa named by Louis Jean Pierre Vieillot
Taxonomy articles created by Polbot